Montalba may refer to:

 Montalba, Texas
 Anthony R. Montalba (1813–1884), Swedish-born, British artist
 Clara Montalba (1842-1929), a British watercolour artist
 Henrietta Skerrett Montalba (1856–1893), a British sculptor